Jerome A. Feldman is professor emeritus of electrical engineering and computer science at the University of California, Berkeley. He is a fellow of the American Association for the Advancement of Science since 2005 and a fellow of the Association for the Advancement of Artificial Intelligence since 1990.

Selected publications
 From Molecule to Metaphor: A Neural Theory of Language. Bradford Books, Cambridge, MA: MIT Press, 2006.

References

External links 
Jerry Feldman's Personal Home Page at ICSI

Living people
University of California, Berkeley faculty
Fellows of the American Association for the Advancement of Science
American computer scientists
Year of birth missing (living people)